Edlaston and Wyaston is a civil parish in the Derbyshire Dales district of Derbyshire, England. The parish contains seven listed buildings that are recorded in the National Heritage List for England. Of these, one is listed at Grade II*, the middle of the three grades, and the others are at Grade II, the lowest grade.  The parish contains the villages of Edlaston and Wyaston and the surrounding area.  The listed buildings consist of a church, a cross and two tombs in the churchyard, two houses, and farm buildings.


Key

Buildings

References

Citations

Sources

 

Lists of listed buildings in Derbyshire